Richard High Ebright is an American molecular biologist. He is the Board of Governors Professor of Chemistry and Chemical Biology at Rutgers University and Laboratory Director at the Waksman Institute of Microbiology.

Early life and education
Ebright received an A.B. summa cum laude in biology from Harvard University in 1981 and a PhD in microbiology and molecular genetics from Harvard University in 1987. He was a junior fellow of the Harvard Society of Fellows from 1984 to 1987.

Career

Ebright was appointed as a faculty member in the Department of Chemistry at Rutgers University and as a Laboratory Director at the Waksman Institute of Microbiology in 1987.  He was co-appointed as an Investigator of the Howard Hughes Medical Institute from 1997 to 2013.

Ebright's research has included the experimental demonstration that amino-acid-base contacts mediate DNA sequence recognition in protein-DNA interaction, the determination of the three-dimensional structural organization of the transcription initiation complex; the demonstration that transcription start-site selection and initial transcription involve "DNA scrunching", the demonstration that transcription activation can proceed by a "recruitment" mechanism, the demonstration that bacterial transcription-translation coupling involves direct physical bridging of RNA polymerase and a ribosome by NusA and NusG, the demonstration that bacterial Rho-dependent transcription termination involves the molecular-motor activity of the termination factor Rho,  and the identification of novel antibacterial drug targets in bacterial RNA polymerase.

In 1994, Ebright was awarded the American Society of Biochemistry and Molecular Biology Schering-Plough Award for his research on transcription activation. In 1995, he received the Academic Press Walter J. Johnson Prize. In 2013, he received a National Institutes of Health MERIT Award. He was elected as a Fellow of the American Academy of Microbiology in 1996, the American Association for the Advancement of Science in 2004, the Infectious Diseases Society of America in 2011, and the American Academy of Arts and Sciences in 2016. He is the subject of a piece named "The Making of a Scientist" in a high school textbook published by NCERT (and recommended by the CBSE) in India.

He has opposed the proliferation of laboratories working on biological weapons agents and has supported the strengthening of biosafety and biosecurity measures to reduce risks of release of biological weapons.

COVID-19 origins

Ebright has stated that the genome and properties of SARS-CoV-2 provide no basis to conclude the virus was engineered as a bioweapon, but he also has stated that the possibility that the virus entered humans through a laboratory accident cannot be dismissed and has called for a thorough investigation of the origin of the pandemic and for measures to reduce the risk of future pandemics.

Ebright has accused NIAID director Anthony Fauci, NIH director Francis Collins and deputy director Lawrence Tabak of "lying to the public", about their past and continuing denials of NIH funding having been utilized for gain-of-function experiments at the Wuhan Institute of Virology.

References

External links 

 Waksman Institute faculty webpage
 Publications by Richard H. Ebright on Google Scholar

American biochemists
American biophysicists
American geneticists
American microbiologists
American molecular biologists
Fellows of the American Academy of Arts and Sciences
Fellows of the American Association for the Advancement of Science
Howard Hughes Medical Investigators
Rutgers University faculty
Harvard College alumni
Living people
1959 births
Harvard Graduate School of Arts and Sciences alumni